Guitars Sound Softly Through the Night (German: Gitarren klingen leise durch die Nacht) is a 1960 Austrian romantic musical film directed by Hans Deppe and starring Fred Bertelmann, Margit Nünke and Vivi Bach.

It was shot at the Rosenhügel Studios in Vienna and on location in Sicily. The film's sets were designed by the art directors Fritz Jüptner-Jonstorff and Alexander Sawczynski.

Cast
 Fred Bertelmann as Fred Wiskott  
 Margit Nünke as Ninon Lorraine  
 Vivi Bach as Marina  
 Peter Weck as Toni Weinheber  
 Walter Gross as Paulchen Sperling  
 Friedl Czepa as Lucie  
 Gaetano Stancampiano as Roberto  
 Walter Wilz as Jacopo  
 Grit Boettcher as Eleanor  
 Fritz Imhoff as Postbote Gerlach  
 Alfred Böhm 
 Teo Prokop 
 Hedy Richter as Solotänzerin  
 Gerhard Senft as Solotänzer

References

Bibliography 
 Gerhard Bliersbach. So grün war die Heide: der deutsche Nachkriegsfilm in neuer Sicht. Beltz, 1985.

External links 
 

1960 films
Austrian romantic musical films
1960s romantic musical films
1960s German-language films
Films directed by Hans Deppe
Films set in Sicily
Sascha-Film films
Films shot at Rosenhügel Studios
UFA GmbH films